Chal Tak may refer to:
 Chal Tak-e Pain